Rodney Esekia Iona (born 17 August 1991) is a Samoan rugby union footballer who currently plays as a fly half and Centre for the Brumbies in the  Super Rugby Pacific 2022. He also plays for the New Orleans Gold in Major League Rugby (MLR) in the U.S.

He previously represented the Canberra Vikings in the inaugural National Rugby Championship.

Career

Originally from Melbourne, Iona made his way north to Australia's capital Canberra in an attempt to forge out a rugby career for himself.    In 2011 he linked up with the Tuggeranong Vikings who play in the ACTRU Premier Division while attending the  academy.   He represented the Brumbies at sevens and won the World Club Sevens Championship in 2013 and also played in the World Club 10s tournament in Singapore.

His debut didn't go quite as well as he'd have liked with his first pass being intercepted which resulted in a Waratahs try. Despite this Iona was offered a full-time one-year contract with the Brumbies ahead of the 2015 Super Rugby season.

Iona also played for the Canberra Vikings in the first ever National Rugby Championship in 2014 making 6 appearances.

Iona joined French Rugby Pro D2 side AS Béziers Hérault in July 2016. He made 18 appearances in his first season, but suffered a serious neck injury after just four matches in 2017 that threatened his career. He was released by Béziers and joined Spanish División de Honor de Rugby side UE Santboiana.

Super Rugby statistics

References

External links 

1991 births
Living people
AS Béziers Hérault players
Australian sportspeople of Samoan descent
Australian rugby union players
ACT Brumbies players
Canberra Vikings players
Jersey Reds players
Melbourne Rising players
Rugby union centres
Rugby union fly-halves
Rugby union players from Melbourne
Samoa international rugby union players
Samoan rugby union players
Western Force players
New Orleans Gold players
Australian expatriate sportspeople in Spain
Australian expatriate sportspeople in Jersey
Australian expatriate sportspeople in France
Samoan expatriate sportspeople in France
Samoan expatriate sportspeople in Spain
Samoan expatriate sportspeople in Jersey